This is a list of schools in Latvia.

Schools in Riga

State Gymnasiums in Riga 
Riga State Gymnasium No.1
Riga State Gymnasium No.2
Riga State Gymnasium No.3
Āgenskalna State Gymnesium
Riga State Classical Gymnesium
Riga State German Grammar School

Gymnasiums in Riga 
Riga English Gymnasium
Scandinavian Country Gymnasium
Riga Zolitūde Gymnasium

Lyceums in Riga 
Riga French Lycée
Pushkin Lyceum (Riga)

Highschools in Riga 
International School of Riga
Emīls Dārziņš Music School
Jānis Rozentāls Art High School
Riga Dome Choir School
Riga Secondary School No. 13
International School of Latvia (in Piņķi)

Schools in Dobele 
Dobele State Gymnasium

Schools in Ogre 
Jaunogre Secondary School

Schools in Saldus 
Saldus Art School

Schools in Ventspils 
Ventspils Gymnasium No.1

Schools in Liepāja 
Liepaja State Gymnasium 1

See also

Education in Latvia
List of universities in Latvia

 
Latvia
Latvia
Schools
Schools
Schools